Critical care may refer to:

 Critical care medicine or intensive-care medicine, a branch of medicine concerned with life support for critically ill patients
 "Critical Care" (Star Trek: Voyager), an episode of the TV series
 Critical Care (film), a 1997 film directed by Sidney Lumet
 Critical Care, a novel by Richard Dooling; basis for the film
 Critical Care (journal), an online journal of intensive care medicine published by BioMed Central
 Critical Care Medicine, published by Lippincott Williams & Wilkins for the Society of Critical Care Medicine

See also